The 1962 Monaco Grand Prix was a Formula One motor race held at Monaco on 3 June 1962. It was race 2 of 9 in both the 1962 World Championship of Drivers and the 1962 International Cup for Formula One Manufacturers. The 100-lap race was won by Cooper driver Bruce McLaren after he started from third position. Phil Hill finished second for the Ferrari team and his teammate Lorenzo Bandini came in third.

Report

Lotus's Jim Clark claimed the first pole position of his career, ahead of BRM's Graham Hill, Cooper's Bruce McLaren and Ferrari's Willy Mairesse. The organisers guaranteed two spots on the grid for each of the 5 works teams, leaving six grid spots for the remaining entries to fight over. This explains why some drivers with faster qualifying times failed to qualify whereas drivers with slower times qualified.

Mairesse got an excellent start from fourth on the grid and led into the first corner, the Gasworks hairpin, but braked too late and skidded around it. The concertina effect of the cars behind trying to avoid Mairesse's skidding car led to a collision further behind which eliminated Dan Gurney, Maurice Trintignant and Richie Ginther. A marshal, Ange Baldoni, was killed by the dislodged right rear wheel of Richie Ginther's BRM when it collided with the Lotuses of Maurice Trintignant, Innes Ireland and Trevor Taylor, as well as Dan Gurney's Porsche at the Gasometer hairpin on lap 1.

McLaren and Graham Hill both passed Mairesse on the exit of Gasworks hairpin; the New Zealander ended the first lap in the lead from the Englishman. Meanwhile, Mairesse spun at the station hairpin on the first lap, dropping down the order.

McLaren led until the seventh lap when he was passed by Graham Hill; the BRM driver held the lead all the way until lap 92, when an engine failure handed the lead back to McLaren who held on to win ahead of Ferrari's Phil Hill, who recovered from a spin earlier in the race. Hill's Ferrari team mate Lorenzo Bandini completed the podium places.

Classification

Qualifying 

 Drivers that had to qualify on speed: only the six fastest would race.

Race

Championship standings after the race 

Drivers' Championship standings

Constructors' Championship standings

 Notes: Only the top five positions are included for both sets of standings.

References

Monaco Grand Prix
Monaco Grand Prix
Grand Prix
Monaco Grand Prix